Ian Reddington (born 25 September 1957) is an English actor with many stage and television credits since the early 1980s. He became widely known for television roles such as the Chief Clown in the Doctor Who serial The Greatest Show in the Galaxy, Richard Cole in EastEnders and Vernon Tomlin in Coronation Street.

Early life 
Ian Reddington was born in Walkley in Sheffield. He was educated at Frecheville Comprehensive. He had no formal drama training at school but became a leading figure in the Meatwhistle youth theatre project run by youth workers in the city. This gave him his first appearance as the Herald in Peter Weiss's Marat/Sade at the Sheffield Crucible in 1973 directed by Glen Walford. He also played percussion and sang backing vocals in proto-punk band Musical Vomit alongside Glenn Gregory, who later went on to become lead singer with Heaven 17. Reddington then went on to study acting at the Royal Academy of Dramatic Art in London (1976–1979), at the time one of their youngest ever entrants. While there, he won The William Poel Prize and The Arthur Talbot Smith Award.

Career

Television 

Reddington's earliest television appearances were in Sharon and Elsie (1984), Doug Lucie's Hard Feelings in Play for Today (1984), Three Up, Two Down (1986) and Casualty (1987). In 1989, he was voted Best Villain of the 25th anniversary season by Doctor Who Magazine readers for his portrayal of the Chief Clown in the serial The Greatest Show in the Galaxy, which starred Sylvester McCoy as the Seventh Doctor. In 2015, author Cameron K. McEwan described it as "a superb performance and, still to this day, one of Who's finest villains". Reddington reprised this role for the Big Finish audio drama The Psychic Circus in 2020.

Between 1992 and 1994, he had a recurring role as Richard Cole (aka Tricky Dicky) in EastEnders. He later became one of only two actors to portray a major role in the UK's two biggest soap operas (the other being Michelle Collins) after his portrayal of Vernon Tomlin, the hapless drummer, in Coronation Street from 2005 until 2008.

His many other television appearances have included episodes of The Bill, Boon, Holby City, Benidorm, Doctors, Peak Practice, Playing the Field, Robin Hood, Inspector Morse and Cadfael, The Sculptress, The Queen's Nose, Jane Hall and Yellow Thread Street and memorably as Tommy the council worker in Shameless, Being April and his own children's series Snap.

In 2017, he appeared in the BBC series Father Brown as Samuel Jacobs in the fifth-season episode "The Penitent Man", and played Harry Tomkins in the third season of Outlander. In December 2021, alongside son Tyler Reddington, he portrayed the role of Frankie Clitheroe in Doctors.

Theatre 

Reddington's theatre work is extensive and started with The Royal Shakespeare Company. He played Master Froth in Measure for Measure, The Tailor in The Taming of the Shrew (Play of the Year), a 'shape' in The Tempest (along with Ruby Wax and Juliet Stevenson), The Churchill Play,  The Shepherds Play, the multi-award-winning Piaf and for the RSC in the West End both Wild Oats and Once in a Lifetime. He then went to the Bristol Old Vic to play Kent in Edward the Second and Oh! What A Lovely War. It was then out into repertory theatre with leading roles at Plymouth, Stoke, the British première of Thomas Hardy's The Dynasts for Exeter, and in Nottingham Byron's Cain.

For Great Eastern Stage he performed in Travesties. Back at the Bristol Old Vic he appeared in Androcles and The Lion and She Stoops To Conquer and in The Woman Who Cooked Her Husband for Nottingham Playhouse. Then to The Citizen's Theatre, Glasgow where he was seen in world premières of Judith and Saint Joan. In London's fringe he played the title role in Katie Mitchell's Arden of Faversham at the Old Red Lion Theatre, Alec D'Urbaville in Tess at The Latchmere. Also there he performed The Promise with his own company One Word, The Collector at The Spice of Life and Rutherford and Son at The New End. At The Bush Theatre under Mike Bradwell he appeared in the award-winning Hard Feelings (play) and Flamingoes, Black Mas for Foco Novo and Pamela for Shared Experience. A Who's Who of Flapland for Lakeside, Nottingham. World Premieres of In Pursuit of the English and Hangover Square at The Lyric Hammersmith.

He worked with English experimental company Lumiere and Son in War Dance and then performed in Italy with the avant-Garde La Zattere Di Babele in Tamburlaine. Further classical work saw him perform Hamlet for the Oxford Stage Company, Richard the Third for the Stafford Festival and Macbeth in London. For the International New Writers Festival in Birmingham he appeared in Akos Nemeth's Car Thieves and also a platform performance of A Day in the Death of Joe Egg at The Royal National Theatre.
He has also been seen in Peter Nichols' Blue Murder, Happy as A Sandbag, the award Winning Dead Funny, Ben Elton's Gasping and The Woman in Black with Frank Finlay. For the West Yorkshire Playhouse he appeared in the much acclaimed The Lemon Princess.

He played the part of Joe's dad in the Olivier Award-winning musical Our House. He played Pop in the hit musical We Will Rock You in 2011.

He has adapted for the stage John Fowles's The Collector and (with his friend Paul Bower) Ramón del Valle-Inclán's Luces de Bohemia.

Film 

Although mostly known for his work on stage and in television, Reddington made his film debut as Bassett in the cult fantasy film Highlander in 1986, duelling with Christopher Lambert.

Highlander (1986) - Bassett
Crimestrike (1990)
Who Needs a Heart (1991) - Jack
Speak Like a Child (1998) - Master
The Adventurer: The Curse of the Midas Box (2013) - Ratchit
The Spiritualist (2016) - Father
Fanged Up (2017) - Francis the Bus Driver
The Sisters Brothers (2018) - The Father
Kaleidoscope Man (2018) - Gerry Miller

Discography 

For Sheffield Wednesday F.C. he has written and recorded :   
"Move on up for steel city" – The Hillsborough Crew 
"If it's Wednesday it must be Wembley" – The Hillsborough Crew (Blue Wave SWFCP1) 
"Oh yes" – The Wednesday Kop Band (Blue Wave Kop Band 1) 
"Euromania" – Elevenveeeleven (Cherry Red Records cdgaffer6)

Personal life
Reddington married Lynda Ford on 18 October 2009 in Sheffield.
He is a supporter of the Bobby Moore Fund, which raises money for research into bowel cancer and is also a patron of Ali's Dream and Brain Tumour Research. He was guest star at one of the first Wii charity tennis events to be held in the United Kingdom. He is an active participant and supporter of the National Student Drama Festival.

Reddington is a supporter of the Labour Party and was involved in the planning campaign for the South Northamptonshire Labour candidate Sophie Johnson in the 2017 UK general election, which included helping to make her election video.

References

Citations

External links

1957 births
20th-century English male actors
21st-century English male actors
Alumni of RADA
English male Shakespearean actors
English male soap opera actors
English male stage actors
Labour Party (UK) people
Living people
Male actors from Yorkshire
Male actors from Sheffield